A state of exception is a concept introduced in the 1920s by the German philosopher and jurist Carl Schmitt, similar to a state of emergency (martial law) but based in the sovereign's ability to transcend the rule of law in the name of the public good.

Background
The idea that a state may need to deal with unforeseen and critical problems is ancient; for instance, the Republican Roman concept of the dictatorship allowed a single person to take extraordinary measures, under strict controls. Renaissance thinkers such as Machiavelli and Jean Bodin also discussed the problem. However, while monarchy implies elements of unaccountability and extralegal powers, modern republican constitutions attempt to remove these factors, raising the question of how to deal with such emergencies. 

Before the twentieth century, constitutions did not define a state of emergency in great detail. For instance, the Constitution of the United States allows the suspension of habeas corpus, but only with the agreement of Congress; the executive does not have this power itself. The French Constitution of 1848 stated that a law should be passed defining a state of exception, but did not itself define one. Given the difficult circumstances of post-World War One Germany, it is understandable that the Weimar Constitution included Article 48, allowing emergency powers; however, these were never legally defined.

Theory
Schmitt introduced the concept of “state of emergency” in his 1921 essay On Dictatorship, influenced by what he saw as the weakness of the Weimar Constitution and the necessity of a strong ruler. In his later essay Political Theology he defined political sovereignty as, essentially, the ability to ignore the law, and that this was necessary given the unforeseeable nature of emergencies. "In Schmitt's terms," Masha Gessen wrote in Surviving Autocracy (2020), when an emergency "shakes up the accepted order of things...the sovereign steps forward and institutes new, extralegal rules."

This concept is developed in Giorgio Agamben's book State of Exception (2005) and Achille Mbembe's Necropolitics (2019). Agamben investigates how the state of exception can become extended, for instance how the United States treated prisoners captured during the "war on terror", and Mbembe describes how the state of exception can be used to reduce people to precarity and justify violence and killing. 

It can be either grounded upon autonomous sources of law (like international treaties) or featured as external to the juridical order.

Examples
An example from Nazi Germany is the Reichstag Fire (the arson against the German parliament) which led to President von Hindenburg's Reichstag Fire Decree following Hitler's advice. This decree indefinitely suspended most of the Weimar Republic’s civil liberties, including habeas corpus, freedom of expression, freedom of the press, freedom of association, and the right to public assembly. A month later, after the government had used these powers to arrest Communist and Social Democrat members, the Reichstag passed the Enabling Act, with the legal assistance of Schmitt, allowing Hitler to rule without the Reichstag’s consent. Although couched as a temporary measure, the state of exception remained in place until Hitler’s defeat in 1945, allowing him to rule under what amounted to martial law.

The consequences of entering a state of exception may unroll slowly. "Even the original Reichstag Fire was not the Reichstag Fire of our imagination—a singular event that changed the course of history once and for all," Gessen wrote, pointing out that the Second World War did not begin for another six years after the Reichstag burned.

See also
Article 48 (Weimar Constitution)
State of emergency
Unitary executive theory

References

Sources
 Carl Schmitt, Die Diktatur. Von den Anfängen des modernen Souveränitätsgedankens bis zum proletarischen Klassenkampf, 1921.
 Carl Schmitt, Politische Theologie. Vier Kapitel zur Lehre von der Souveränität, 1922.

Philosophy of law
Political philosophy
Emergency laws